Thomas Durward Pennington Jr. (November 26, 1939 – March 4, 2013) was an American football placekicker who played in the American Football League (AFL). He was born in Albany, Georgia. Pennington played college football for the Georgia Bulldogs. He was drafted by the Green Bay Packers in the 12th round (168th overall) of the 1962 National Football League Draft and the Buffalo Bills in the 11th round (86th overall) of the 1962 AFL Draft but did not play for either team. He played with the Dallas Texans in 1962.

See also
Other American Football League players

External links
Pro-Football-Reference

References

1939 births
2013 deaths
Sportspeople from Albany, Georgia
Players of American football from Georgia (U.S. state)
American football placekickers
Georgia Bulldogs football players
Dallas Texans (AFL) players